Nong is a district (muang) of Savannakhet province in southern Laos.

Settlements
A Alao

References

Districts of Savannakhet province